Nothoceros is a genus of hornworts in the family Dendrocerotaceae. The genus is found in New Zealand, South America, and neotropical and eastern North America.

References

External links

Hornworts
Bryophyte genera